Firth is a surname. Notable people with the surname include:

Anna Firth (elected 2022), British politician
Barbara Firth (1928–2013), British illustrator
Cecil Mallaby Firth (1878–1931), English archaeologist
Charles Firth (comedian), Australian comedian
Charles Firth (coach), former head coach
Charles Harding Firth (1857–1936), British historian
Colin Firth (born 1960), British actor
David Firth (born 1983), British animator
Everett Firth (1930–2015), American musician and businessman
Harry Firth (1918–2014), Australian racing driver and race team manager
John Rupert Firth (1890–1960), British linguist
John Firth (1900–1957), British cricketer
Jonathan Firth (born 1967), British actor
Joseph Firth (1859–1931), New Zealand educator
Josiah Firth (1826–1897), New Zealand farmer, businessman and politician
Julian Firth (born 1960) British actor
Malaika Firth (born 1994), British–Kenyan model
Mark Firth (1819–1880), British steel magnate
Nicholas Firth, British businessman
Peter Firth (born 1953), British actor
Roy Firth (born ), rugby league footballer
Scott Firth, British musician and producer
Scott Firth (soccer) (born 2001), Canadian soccer player
Shirley Firth (1953–2013), Canadian cross-country skier
Raymond Firth (1901–2002), New Zealand anthropologist
Vic Firth (1930–2015), American percussionist, founder of Vic Firth Company
Will Firth (born 1965), Australian literary translator

English-language surnames